A  is the most common of the traditional frames used for making , a type of Japanese braid.

Etymology 
The marudai is generally made of a close-grained wood and consists of a round disk ( or "mirror") with a hole in the center, supported by four legs set in a base. The Western style   allows the braider to sit in a chair to braid.

The warp threads that form the braid are wound around weighted bobbins called .  were once made of clay, but now are most commonly wood filled with lead. The weight of the  maintains even tension on the warp threads, and is balanced by a bag of counterweights called  that is attached to the base of the braid.

Instead flexible plastic bobbins are used to prevent tangling of the threads. Unlike  disks,  have no indication of where the thread should be placed; it is done freehand.

Related terms 
  – "Mirror", the polished wooden top disk of the 
  – a class of patterns for round cord all involving eight threads folded in half for a total of sixteen strands. In clockwise order, each bobbins is moved to the opposite side. When different combinations of thread color are used, many interesting patterns emerge, including diagonal stripes, diamonds on a background, triangles resembling hearts, and tiny six-petalled flowers.  is named for the venerable Kongō Gumi company of Japan, the oldest known company in the world.
  or  – Japanese for "gathered threads".
  – the cord used to fasten the  securely in some  styles.
  – Counterweights used in  braiding
  – little spools.
True silk – a hollow fiber with a rough surface that resists slipping past the loop unless gently pulled. For synthetic fibers, a flexible plastic "clamshell" bobbin may be preferable.

Further reading 
Yamaoka, Kazuharu Issei. (1975) Domyo no kimihimo : marudai, yotsu-uchidai [Domyo style kumihimo]. Tokyo : Shufunotomo Publication (Handicraft series). ,  
Kyōto Kimono Gakuin. (1979) A Step to kimono and kumihimo. Pasadena, Calif: International College of California. .
 Carey, Jacqui. (1994) Creative Kumihimo. Torquay: Devonshire Press. , . 
Tada, Makiko. (1996) Andesu No Kumihimo: Kādo to Marudai. [Andean sling braids]. (Kumihimo sōran series, 2) Hino : Tekusuto. 2nd ed.,  with some English. ,  .
 Carey, Jacqui. (1997) The Craft of Kumihimo. New York: Midpoint Trade Books, In. , .
 Carey, Jacqui. (1997) Beginner's Guide to Braiding, the Craft of Kumihimo. Tunbridge Wells : Search Press. ,  
Tada, Makiko (2008). Tada Makiko Kumihimo-ten : dento no bi to sentan gijutsu [Makiko Tada kumihimo show : traditional beauty and the latest technics]. Naruse Memorial Hall (ed). Tokyo : Japan Women's College (Tsukuru series 5). . 
Sakai, Aiko ; Tada, Makiko. E o mite wakaru kumihimo : Tanoshiku dekiru marudai kakudai ayadake-dai [Visual guide to kumihimo : practice on marudai, kakudai, and ayadake-dai with fun], Japan Vogue, . 
 Owen, Rodrick. (1995) Braids: 250 Patterns from Japan, Peru & Beyond. Loveland, Colo. : Interweave Press, . Softcover ed., Berkeley, CA : Lacis, 2004. 
Tada, Makiko. (April 2014) Marudai braids 120.(Comprehensive treatise of braids  1), 3rd ed., Hino  : Tekusuto.  with some English. 
 Chottikampon K.; Mathurosemontri S.; Marui H.; Sirisuwan P.; Inoda M., et al.  (2015) Comparison of braiding skills between expert and non-experts by eye’s movement measurement. Lecture Notes in Computer Science (including subseries Lecture Notes in Artificial Intelligence and Lecture Notes in Bioinformatics) 9184 (2015): 14-23 ,  
Tada, Makiko. (2017). Utsukushii kumihimo to komono no reshipi: marudai de tsukuru honkakuteki na kumihimo o mijika na dōgu de yasashiku kawaiku. [Beautiful kumihimo recipes for marudai you braid with everyday tool, fun and pretty] Tōkyō :  Nihon Bungeisha. , .

Footnotes

References

Braids
Handicrafts
Ropework
Manufacturing
Hobbies
Wood
Japanese words and phrases